Flamenca is a 13th-century anonymous romance, written in the Occitan language in Occitania.

Most literary allusions in the text are from Old French sources.

The author

A certain Sir Bernardet may have been the author, however the Bernardet mentioned may simply be the fictional narrator. Nothing is known for certain about the author; however, a number of things may be inferred from the circumstances of the text itself. The author was probably not a minstrel, but rather a cleric, most likely in the service of the Roquefeuil family at the court of Alga, and may have written the romance at the Benedictine monastery at Nant, Aveyron, and was erudite and may have even studied at the University of Paris. The author was probably a native of Rouergue, based on linguistic similarities in the language used in the romance and that of the region.

In popular culture
Spanish singer Rosalía based her 2018 album El Mal Querer on Flamenca. Every song was named after a chapter from the book.

References

External links
 Le Roman de Flamenca corpus (Indiana University, Bloomington) 

13th-century books
Old Occitan literature
Rouergue
Aveyron
Medieval French romances